The USL Championship Final is the post-season championship match of the USL Championship, the second tier of professional men's soccer in the United States. The winner is crowned champion in the same manner as in other North American sports leagues (i.e. via a playoff following a regular season).

Unlike most soccer league, but much like North American sports leagues, the USL champion does not earn promotion into Major League Soccer, due to the fixed membership structure found in the league.

As of 2022, the USL Championship Final is typically held in mid-November and features the Eastern Conference champion and Western Conference champion. The predecessor to the USL Championship Final was the A-League Championship and the USL-1 Championship.

Champions

A-League era (1996–2004)

USL-1 era (2005–2009)

USL Championship era (2010–)

Records and statistics

USL Championship titles 

As of the 2021 season, 52 teams have competed in USL under its current branding. Twelve of these teams have appeared in a cup final, with six of these teams having won the USL Cup.

See also 
 MLS Cup
 USL Shield

References 

 
USL Championship matches
Lists of association football matches